The Rans S-9 Chaos is an American single-engined, tractor configuration, single-seat, mid-wing monoplane designed by Randy Schlitter for aerobatics and manufactured by Rans Inc. The Chaos is available in kit form for amateur construction.

Production of the S-9 was ended as part of Rans' reorganization of its product line on 1 June 2006, after having been available for 20 years, but the S-9 was reintroduced in about 2009 and is again available.

Design and development
The S-9 Chaos was designed by Randy Schlitter in 1986 as an inexpensive aerobatic aircraft that will allow sportsman competition aerobatics to be flown or even advanced aerobatics if inverted fuel and oil systems are installed. The Chaos is also a capable cross country aircraft.

Like many Rans models, the S-9 features a welded 4130 steel tube cockpit, with a bolted aluminum tube rear fuselage. All fuselage, wing and tail surfaces are covered in dope and fabric. The reported construction time is 500 man-hours.

The Chaos has conventional landing gear.

The S-10 Sakota aerobatic two-seater was later developed from the S-9.

Operational history
There were 215 S-9s built and flown by December 2011.

In November 2010 there were 61 S-9s registered in the United States, along with three registered in Canada and two in the UK. Another 23 were on the registers of European countries west of Russia.

Specifications (S-9)

See also

References

External links

Photo of an S-9 Chaos
Photo of an S-9 Chaos descending under a parachute after a structural failure

1980s United States civil utility aircraft
Homebuilt aircraft
S-009 Chaos
Aerobatic aircraft
Mid-wing aircraft
Single-engined tractor aircraft
Aircraft first flown in 1986